Otelfingen Golfpark is a railway station in Switzerland. The station is situated in the municipality of Otelfingen. The station is located on the Furttal railway line and is a stop of the Zurich S-Bahn served by line S6.

References 

Railway stations in the canton of Zürich
Swiss Federal Railways stations